Paradip Port is a natural, deep-water port on the East coast of India in Paradip, just  from Jagatsinghpur city in Jagatsinghpur district of Odisha, India.

The port is administered by the Paradip Port Authority (PPA)(formerly Paradip Port Trust), an autonomous corporation wholly owned by the Government of India.

History
Paradip is one of the major ports of India and the only major port in Odisha. Biju Patnaik, the then Chief Minister of Odisha, is the founding father of Paradip Port. It is situated 210 nautical miles south of Kolkata and 260 nautical miles north of Vishakhapatnam on the east coast on the shore of Bay of Bengal.

Jawaharlal Nehru, the then Prime Minister of India, laid the foundation stone of the port on 3 January 1962 near the confluence of the river Mahanadi and the Bay of Bengal.

Government of India took over the management of the port from the Government of Odisha on 1 June 1965. Maiden berthing was by INS Investigator on 12 March 1966. The port was declared open by Peter Stambolic, the Prime Minister of Yugoslavia on the same day.
Government of India declared Paradip Port as the eighth major port of India on 18 April 1966 making it the first major port in the East Coast commissioned after independence.

The Port of Paradip, an autonomous body under the Major Port Trusts Act, 1963 functioning under Ministry of Shipping is administered by a Board of Trustees set up by the Government of India headed by the chairman. The Trustees of the Trust Board are nominated by Government of India from various users of the port such as shippers, ship owners, Government Departments concerned and also port labour. The day-to-day administration is carried out under general supervision and control of the chairman, assisted by the Deputy Chairman and other departmental heads.

Connectivity 
The port is connected with Broad-gauge electrified Railway system for the East-Coast Railway and is also served by National Highway 53 and State Highway No.12. Port is well connected with Cuttack and Bhubaneswar with bus & train both the services.

The port is also connected by bus routes to the steel city of Rourkela, Kolkata and to the holy town of Puri & Konark.

The port is connected through lease line and broadband to other Ports, Ministry and IPA. Reliance, BSNL, Airtel, TATA Indicom etc. have cellular services at Paradip Port. 4G network facility is available in Paradip Port town.

Business facilities

Port harbor 
The port of Paradip has an artificial lagoon type harbour protected by two rubble mound "Break Waters" and approached by the dredged channel. The North Break Water is 538 m long on the North-Eastern side of the port and the South Break Water is 1217 m long on the South-Eastern side.

The position of the Channels inside the harbour is as under:

Pilotage and towage facilities 
The Pilotage is compulsory for all vessels above 200 MTs Gross Tonnage. The Pilotage service is available to all vessels during 24 hours and 365 days. The Pilot Boarding ground is about  SE of Breakwaters. All the vessels have to inform their ETA prior to entering the port Limits to the port Signal Station on VHF Channel: 16 / 06. The port has 3 Nos. Tugs having BP more than 35 Tons and 2 Nos. of port Tugs having BP more than 50 Tons. All the tugs are fitted with fire fighting equipment for external general and oil fire. The port is having 3 Nos. Pilot Launches having speed more than 10 knots, 02 Nos. pilot lunches having speed of 7 knots and 02 Nos. Mooring Boats are also available for passing the Mooring Lines to the Berth / Jetty.

Marine pollution's control and reception facilities 
The port Complies to all the Regulations of MARPOL 73/78 and has a Pollution Control Cell to monitor the Pollution in the Harbour. The port has a Pollution Control Vessel with a Skimmer, chemical dispersant spray system and Oil Containment Boom. The port also has a 300 T Oil Reception Barge. The port has engaged security cum pollution response vessel with all required pollution response equipment & the same is installed at SPM area. The port has engaged private firms having permission from Central Pollution Control Board and State Pollution Control Board to receive waste / used / oily water from the vessels for re-processing / re-cycling as required by MARPOL 73/78 Annexure-I. The port has also engaged private firms to collect garbage from the vessels in Port as required by MARPOL 73/78 Annexure-V. The reception facilities for other annexures of MARPOL 73/78 can be arranged by advance notice given by ship owners / local agents.

Fresh water services 
Adequate fresh water supply services rendered to all vessels at berth through shore connection. All self-propelled fresh water barge is available to supply freshwater up to 350 MT at berth and at anchorage.

Storage facilities

Container handling facilities 
The port handles containers in a limited manner with cargo support from NALCO, Marine Products Exporters, TISCO, JSL and others. The port has 1000 TEU capacity container yard served with two railway sidings and 15 reefer plug points. One 75 MT and Two 20 MT mobile cranes, two spreaders (40 feet & 20 feet) are available in the port to facilitate for container handling. These equipment are duly supported by 2 (two) Reach stacker & other container handling equipment from private source.

 Berthing priority for container vessels. Hence, nil waiting.
 50% Concession in both vessel & cargo related charges for container vessels.
 Harbour Mobile cranes at berths to handle containers.
 In-house stuffing / de-stuffing facility.
 Siding facility for Rail handling of containers.

Storage area 
  of concrete paved area near the berth.
 Storage area secured & protected.
 Capacity to store about 1000 TEUs (20 ft).

Equipment available 
 One Mobile crane of 75MT capacity (Port).
 Two 50 MT mobile cranes & one 20 MT forklift (private).
 Adequate trailers to handle TEUs and FEUs (private).

Dry dock / Repairing facilities 
The port has a 500 Ton slipway along with workshop for repair and maintenance of Port crafts and barges. A Wet Basin for Port crafts is available close to the Slipway.

Vessels of  draft can be repaired at Paradip.

Port railways 
The port has its own railway system. The port is equipped with 7 nos. of locomotives to undertake railway operations which is supported by two locomotives on hire from RITES. The port has one of the finest connectivity to the Indian Railways through East Coast Railways for seamless cargo movement by rail.

Electronic data interchange (EDI) 
The port has introduced EDI facility to all its port users for all payments made to the port. The concept is to connect the port users, the bank and the port for faster and easier transfer of funds. Port users are also submitting their documents to port electronically through PCS (Port Community System).

Infrastructure 

 Mechanised Coal Handling Plant
 Iron Ore Handling Plant
 General Cargo Berth
 Oil Jetty
 Captive Berths
 BOT Berths
 RO-RO Jetty
 Container Handling
 Cargo Handling Equipments
 Port Railways
 Storage

References

Further reading 
 
 
 

Ports and harbours of Odisha
Transport in Paradeep